The whitefin shiner (Cyprinella nivea) is a species of fish in the family Cyprinidae. It is endemic to the United States,  where it occurs on the Atlantic Slope from the Neuse River drainage in North Carolina to the Savannah River drainage in Georgia.

References

Cyprinella
Taxa named by Edward Drinker Cope
Fish described in 1870